Karel Benedík (6 November 1923 in Kozojídky – 17 January 1997 in Veselí nad Moravou) was a Czech painter and restorer. He first trained as a painter, then studied at the Academy of Fine Arts in Prague, and focused on restoration work. He painted landscapes, portraits and also showed an interest in Moravian folk costumes.

His restoration work includes a triptych ceiling in the hall of Kroměříž Castle, frescoes in the library and the refectory of the Hradisko Monastery, wall painting in a pharmacy in Uherské Hradiště and three altarpieces in the Church of the Assumption of the Virgin Mary in Kokory.

See also
List of Czech painters

References

Further reading
Surá, Anna: O malířích Slovácka před Uprkou a po něm. Masaryk University, Brno, p. 34 - 36. 
Pelikán, Jaroslav; Trachulec Vít: Karel Benedík. Veselí nad Moravou 1998. 
Mička, Antonín: Kozojídky vzdaly hold svému rodákovi (Malovaný kraj 40, 2004, No 1., p. 13. 

1923 births
1997 deaths
People from Hodonín District
Academy of Fine Arts, Prague alumni
20th-century Czech painters
20th-century Czech male artists
Czech male painters